Ronald Robert Fogleman (born January 27, 1942) is a retired United States Air Force general who served as the 15th Chief of Staff of the Air Force from 1994 to 1997 and as Commanding General of the United States Transportation Command from 1992 to 1994.

Air Force career

A 1963 graduate from the United States Air Force Academy, he holds a master's degree in military history and political science from Duke University. A command pilot and a parachutist, he amassed more than 6,800 flying hours in fighter, transport, tanker and rotary wing aircraft. He flew 315 combat missions and logged 806 hours of combat flying in fighter aircraft. Eighty of his missions during the Vietnam War were as a "Misty FAC" in the F-100F Super Sabre at Phù Cát Air Base, South Vietnam between 25 December 1968 and 23 April 1969.

Fogleman was shot down in Vietnam in 1968, while piloting an F-100. He was rescued by clinging to an AH-1 Cobra attack helicopter that landed at the crash site.

In early assignments he instructed student pilots, performed combat duty as a fighter pilot and high-speed forward air controller in Vietnam and Thailand, taught history at the Air Force Academy and conducted flight operations in Europe—including duty as an F-15 Eagle aircraft demonstration pilot for international airshows. He commanded a USAF wing, an air division, a numbered air force, a major command and a unified combatant command.

Fogleman was the first graduate of the United States Air Force Academy to advance to Chief of Staff of the Air Force. During his tenure, he introduced a simplified code of conduct for airmen, which remains in use today. Called the "Air Force Core Values", the code demands "Integrity First, Service Before Self, and Excellence in All We Do."

During the Bosnian War, Fogleman was - in his position as Chief of Staff of the United States Air Force - involved in the planning of a rescue operation of Scott O'Grady, an American pilot who got shot down by Serbian forces in June 1995. Fogleman's decision to share news of the signals that O'Grady had allegedly sent before the rescue operation was complete, led to criticism at the time. Despite Fogleman releasing this "extremely sensitive piece of information", O'Grady was rescued.

In 1996 Fogleman created the Chief of Staff of the US Air Force (CSAF) Professional Reading Program in order to "develop a common frame of reference among Air Force members -- officers, enlisted, and civilians -- to help each of us become better, more effective advocates of air and space power." The list has been enhanced by subsequent CSAF's and includes books by Rolf Dobelli, Simon Sinek, and Victor Davis Hansen.

Fogleman said in a December 1997 interview—published by Aerospace Power Journal in the spring of 2001—that his retirement was to allow the Secretary of Defense to make a decision on the future of Brigadier General Terryl J. Schwalier, the senior officer in Riyadh at the time of the Khobar Towers bombing, on the merits and facts of the case rather than in response to a perceived protest by a service chief. He did not resign in protest over policy; this would have encroached on civilian control of the military.

Post-Air Force career
After his retirement, Fogleman was named to the Boards of Directors of Alliant Techsystems, AAR Corporation, Mesa Air Group, Inc., Tactical Air Support, Inc., World Air Holdings, Inc., and the Tauriga Sciences Inc.'s Business Advisory Board and to the board of advisors of the Code of Support Foundation, a nonprofit military services organization.

On November 11, 2009, Fogleman was appointed Chairman of the Board of Directors at Alliant Techsystems Inc., following the retirement of ATK Chairman and CEO Dan Murphy.

As a Boeing consultant, Fogleman said that the Lockheed Martin F-35 Lightning II will not be a combat proven aircraft until it receives the Block 3F software in the early 2020s.

In 2018, Fogleman was inducted into the National Aviation Hall of Fame in Dayton, Ohio.

Awards and decorations

In 2013 he was inducted into the Airlift/Tanker Hall of Fame.

References
Official USAF Biography

1942 births
Living people
United States Air Force Academy alumni
Chiefs of Staff of the United States Air Force
United States Air Force personnel of the Vietnam War
Alliant Techsystems
Duke University alumni
Recipients of the Distinguished Service Medal (US Army)
Recipients of the Silver Star
Recipients of the Legion of Merit
Recipients of the Distinguished Flying Cross (United States)
Recipients of the Air Medal
Order of National Security Merit members
Recipients of the Gallantry Cross (Vietnam)
Grand Cordons of the Order of the Rising Sun
Order of the Polar Star
Commandeurs of the Légion d'honneur
Recipients of the Order of the Sword (United States)
Recipients of the Defense Distinguished Service Medal
Recipients of the Navy Distinguished Service Medal
Recipients of the Air Force Distinguished Service Medal
Shot-down aviators